There have been several vessels named "Ava", including:
  – British steamship  built in 1855 and operated by the Peninsular & Oriental Steam Navigation Company on the China mail service; she ran aground and was wrecked off the coast of Ceylon in February 1858.
 – Steamship built 1862, operated between India and Burma, scrapped 1890.
 – Steamship built 1873, owned by British India Steam Navigation Co. Ltd., sunk 1879 following collision  at the mouth of the Hooghly River.
 – Steamship built 1895, ran aground near Mawlamyine in 1905.
 – Steamship built 1906, torpedoed and sunk by a German U-boat SW of Ireland, January 1917.

References

Ship names